Christoph Messerer (born 10 November 2001) is an Austrian professional footballer who plays for SKN St. Pölten.

Club career
He made his Austrian Football Bundesliga debut for SKN St. Pölten on 28 September 2019 in a game against LASK.

After only making a brief appearance in the Austrian Cup in the first half of the 2020–21 season, he was sent on loan to 2. Liga club SV Horn in January 2021. By the end of the loan, he had made 16 appearances in the second division for the club. Ahead of the 2021–22 season he returned to SKN, who had suffered relegation the season before.

References

External links
 

2001 births
Living people
Austrian footballers
Association football midfielders
SKN St. Pölten players
Austrian Football Bundesliga players
Austrian Regionalliga players
Austria youth international footballers
2. Liga (Austria) players
SV Horn players